Chananya Yom Tov Lipa Goldman (1905–1982) was a renowned Orthodox rabbi, dayan, and publisher in Hungary and the United States.

Goldman was born in Neupest (Hungarian: Újpest), a suburb of Budapest, Hungary. His father, Rabbi Yosef Goldman, was the chief rabbi and Av Beit Din of the Orthodox Jewish community. In 1926, at the age of 21, Goldman became a rabbi in Romania, and in 1934 in Bessarabia (then part of Romania). In 1938, after his father died, he was given his father's position as chief rabbi and Av Beit Din of the Orthodox Jewish community in Neupest.

To save his family from the 1944 Nazi invasion of Hungarywhich he anticipated just in timeGoldman obtained false papers that certified them as Aryans. After the war, Goldman's family lived in  Hamburg, Germany. During his time in Germany, Goldman involved himself in Vaad Hatzalah activities. The Joint Distribution Committee arranged for their emigration to the United States, and in April 1949, Goldman was able to reach America's shore aboard the Marine Shark.

In the United States, Goldman was a dayan and publisher of seforim. He published a Shas and various other seforim. His Shas was one of the most popular editions available at the time. Initially, Goldman lived on the Lower East Side, Manhattan, then in Crown Heights, Brooklyn, and finally in Boro Park, Brooklyn. In Boro Park, he served as rabbi of a synagogue known as "Naipest" (namesake of his previous rabbinate, in Hungary). He died in Boro Park in 1982.

References
Levine, Yitzchak. "Hooked On American Jewish History", The Jewish Press, December 6, 2006. Accessed 2008-03-11.
Roth, Jake. "DP Rabbi, Family Dock, Full of Joy", The New York Times, 1949-04-06. Accessed 2008-03-11.

1905 births
1982 deaths
American book publishers (people)
American booksellers
American Orthodox rabbis
Holocaust survivors
Hungarian Jews
Romanian Jews
American people of Hungarian-Jewish descent
Hungarian emigrants to the United States
Hungarian Orthodox rabbis
People from Újpest
20th-century American businesspeople
20th-century American rabbis